Əbilyataq is a village on the Caspian Sea and a municipality in the Khachmaz Rayon of Azerbaijan.  It has a population of 563.

References 

Populated places in Khachmaz District